Terry O'Neal Grant (born March 3, 1987) is a former professional running back for the Hamilton Tiger-Cats of the Canadian Football League.

He was signed by the Hamilton Tiger-Cats as an undrafted free agent on May 30, 2011.  In his first season with the Tiger-Cats he played in six games, rushing for 151 yards on 20 carries and catching 6 passes for 87 yards.

College career

Grant played for the University of Alabama Crimson Tide from 2006 to 2009. His best season was 2007, when he rushed for 891 yards and 8 touchdowns.  He also caught 26 passes for 176 yards and a touchdown that year.  In subsequent years a series of injuries limited his playing time and he was unable to regain his position as a starter.

High school career

Grant scored 113 touchdowns for Lumberton High School.  He amassed 2,700 yards and 36 touchdowns in his senior year and was named Mississhttp://www.hattiesburgamerican.com/story/news/local/lumberton/2015/03/10/grant-pleads-guilty-federal-court/24725033/ippi Mister Football. Terr
http://www.hattiesburgamerican.com/story/news/local/lumberton/2015/03/10/grant-pleads-guilty-federal-court/24725033/

References

External links
Hamilton Tiger-Cats bio
College stats

1987 births
Hamilton Tiger-Cats players
Living people
People from Lumberton, Mississippi
Alabama Crimson Tide football players
Players of American football from Mississippi
American football running backs
Canadian football running backs
African-American players of American football
African-American players of Canadian football
21st-century African-American sportspeople
20th-century African-American people